Calamotis is a genus of moths of the family Yponomeutidae.

Species
Calamotis prophracta - Meyrick, 1918 

Yponomeutidae